Kathryn Newton (born February 8, 1997) is an American actress. She is known for her starring roles as Louise Brooks in the CBS comedy series Gary Unmarried (2008–2010), Abigail Carlson in the HBO mystery drama series Big Little Lies (2017–2019), and Allie Pressman in the Netflix teen drama series The Society (2019). She is also known for portraying the older versions of Claire Novak in The CW dark fantasy series Supernatural (2014–2018), Joanie Clark in the AMC period drama series Halt and Catch Fire (2016–2017).

Newton has starred in the comedy film Bad Teacher (2011), the supernatural horror film Paranormal Activity 4 (2012), for which she received the Young Artist Award for Best Leading Young Actress in a Feature Film, the crime drama film Three Billboards Outside Ebbing, Missouri (2017), the sex comedy film Blockers (2018), the drama film Ben Is Back (2018), the film Pokémon Detective Pikachu (2019), the slasher comedy film Freaky (2020), and the Amazon Studios science fiction romantic comedy-drama The Map of Tiny Perfect Things (2021). She played Cassie Lang in the Marvel Cinematic Universe film Ant-Man and the Wasp: Quantumania (2023).

Early life and education
Newton was born in Orlando, Florida, the only child of Robin and David Newton. She began playing golf tournaments at age 8.

Newton graduated from Notre Dame High School in 2015. She was a member of the Notre Dame High School girls golf team; she helped the school's golf team to win three league championships. She routinely shot in the 70s, and her lowest 18-hole score in a tournament was a 69. In addition, she also set a school record with a five-under-par (-5) round in a nine-hole match and she played to a plus-2 handicap (+2). She initially wanted to play in the 2012 U.S. Women's Open, but she had to withdraw from the sectional qualifier after getting the lead acting role in Paranormal Activity 4.

She postponed college at University of Southern California (USC) to pursue her acting career. She considered playing as a "walk-on" member of the women's golf team at USC.

Career

She started her career at age four, making her television debut on the soap opera All My Children, playing Colby Marian Chandler from 2001 to 2004. Meanwhile, she also starred in two short films, Abbie Down East (2002) and Bun-Bun (2003).  In 2008, Newton was cast in the role of Louise Brooks in the CBS television series Gary Unmarried. When she was twelve, her family moved to Los Angeles, where she attended the Notre Dame High School.

In 2010, Newton won two Young Artist Awards for "Best Performance in a TV Comedy Series" and "Best Performance in a TV series (Comedy or Drama)" for Gary Unmarried. Newton played the role of Chase Rubin-Rossi in the 2011 film Bad Teacher.  She had the lead role, Alex, in the 2012 film Paranormal Activity 4, the fourth in the franchise, and won an award at the 34th Young Artist Awards for her performance in the film. Beginning in season 10, she had a recurring role as Claire Novak on Supernatural. 

In 2017, Newton appeared in the HBO series Big Little Lies based on the Liane Moriarty novel of the same name. She also had major roles in the films Three Billboards Outside Ebbing, Missouri as Angela Hayes and Ben Is Back as Ivy Burns.

Newton plays Lucy in the 2019 blockbuster Pokémon Detective Pikachu, a live action film based on the video game of the same name. She also played the lead role of Allie in the Netflix mystery drama series The Society, which premiered on May 10, 2019. In 2020, she starred in the well-reviewed horror comedy film Freaky, directed by Christopher Landon, as a teenage girl who switches bodies with a serial killer. In 2021, she appeared in The Map of Tiny Perfect Things, directed by Ian Samuels. She portrays Cassie Lang in the Marvel Cinematic Universe film Ant-Man and the Wasp: Quantumania replacing Emma Fuhrmann.

Filmography

Film

Television

Music videos
 "Goodbyes" (2019) by  Post Malone (feat. Young Thug), as Woman

Accolades

Notes

References

External links
 
 

1997 births
21st-century American actresses
American child actresses
American film actresses
Place of birth missing (living people)
American television actresses
Living people
American soap opera actresses
American people of English descent
Actresses from Orlando, Florida
Notre Dame High School (Sherman Oaks, California) alumni